A. Q. M. Mahbub is a Bangladeshi academic and vice-chancellor of the Bangabandhu Sheikh Mujibur Rahman Science and Technology University. He is a former professor of the Department of Geography and the Environment at University of Dhaka.

He works on the themes of environment, population mobility and urban planning.

Biography
Mahbub completed his BSc in 1975 and MSc in 1976 at the University of Dhaka. Two years later, he joined the faculty there as a lecturer in the Department of Geography.

He received his PhD in 1986 from University of Canterbury in New Zealand, for his dissertation Population Mobility in Rural Bangladesh: The Circulation of Working People. Thereafter he continued to teach at the University of Dhaka, and became full professor in the Department of Geography and the Environment in 1997.

After retirement from the University of Dhaka, he was appointed as the vice-chancellor of Bangabandhu Sheikh Mujibur Rahman Science and Technology University (BSMRSTU), Gopalganj in 2020.

In February 2022, Mahbub joined BSMRSTU teachers and students in demonstrating against the gang rape of a student. He was injured when protestors were attacked by alleged members of the Bangladesh Chatra League. After four days of protests, the academic council, chaired by Mahbub, suspended classes for three days.

Publications

References 

Bangladeshi academic administrators
Year of birth missing (living people)
Living people
Vice-Chancellors of the Bangabandhu Sheikh Mujibur Rahman Science and Technology University
University of Dhaka alumni
Academic staff of the University of Dhaka
People from Madaripur District
University of Canterbury alumni